Albert Marsden (13 June 1887 – 17 December 1971) was an Australian cricketer. He played in five first-class matches for Queensland between 1919 and 1921. During World War I he had worked at the munitions plant, HM Factory Gretna.

See also
 List of Queensland first-class cricketers

References

External links
 

1887 births
1971 deaths
Australian cricketers
Queensland cricketers
People from Maryborough, Queensland
Cricketers from Queensland